Heinrich Hagen (born 7 December 1935) is a German long-distance runner. He competed in the marathon at the 1964 Summer Olympics.

References

External links
 

1935 births
Living people
Athletes (track and field) at the 1964 Summer Olympics
German male long-distance runners
German male marathon runners
Olympic athletes of the United Team of Germany
Sportspeople from Rostock
20th-century German people